The Roman Catholic Archdiocese of Cali  is an archdiocese located in the city of Cali in Colombia.

History
 7 June 1910: Established as Diocese of Cali from the Metropolitan Archdiocese of Popayán
 20 June 1964: Promoted as Metropolitan Archdiocese of Cali

Bishops

Ordinaries
 Bishops of Cali (Roman rite) 
Heladio Posidio Perlaza Ramírez (1911.08.11 – 1926.09.28)
Luis Adriano Díaz Melo (1927.04.13 – 1947.11.13)
Julio Caicedo Téllez, S.D.B. (1948.02.23 – 1958.09.24)
Francisco Gallego Pérez (1958.12.18 – 1960.05.21)
Alberto Uribe Urdaneta (1960.07.13 – 1964.06.20)
 Archbishops of Cali (Roman rite)
Alberto Uribe Urdaneta (1964.06.20 – 1985.02.07) 
Pedro Rubiano Sáenz (1985.02.07 – 1994.12.27), appointed Archbishop of Bogotá (Cardinal in 2001)
Isaías Duarte Cancino (1995.08.19 – 2002.03.16)
Juan Francisco Sarasti Jaramillo,  C.I.M. (2002.08.17 – 2011.05.18) 
Darío de Jesús Monsalve Mejía (since 2011.05.18)

Coadjutor archbishops
Pedro Rubiano Sàenz (1983-1985); future Cardinal
Darío de Jesús Monsalve Mejía (2010-2011)

Auxiliary bishops
Miguel Antonio Medina y Medina (1952-1959), appointed Auxiliary Bishop of Medellín
Augusto Aristizábal Ospina (1969-1977), appointed Bishop of Jericó
Juan Francisco Sarasti Jaramillo, C.I.M. (1978-1983), appointed Bishop of Barrancabermeja (later returned here as   Archbishop)
Héctor Luis Gutiérrez Pabón (1987-1998), appointed Bishop of Chiquinquirá
Alfonso Cabezas Aristizábal, C.M. (1988-1992), appointed Coadjutor Bishop of Villavicencio
Julio Enrique Prado Bolaños (1992-1995), appointed Bishop of Pasto 
Edgar de Jesús Garcia Gil (1992-2002), appointed Bishop of Montelibano
José Soleibe Arbeláez (1999-2002), appointed Bishop of Caldas
Luis Adriano Piedrahíta Sandoval (1999-2007), appointed Bishop of Apartadó
Gonzalo Restrepo Restrepo (2003-2006), appointed	Bishop of Girardota
Julio Hernando García Peláez (2005-2010), appointed Bishop of Istmina-Tadó
José Alejandro Castaño Arbeláez, O.A.R. (2006-2010), appointed Bishop of Cartago
José Daniel Falla Robles (2009-2016), appointed Bishop of Soacha
Luis Fernando Rodríguez Velásquez (2014-)
Juan Carlos Cárdenas Toro (2015-2020), appointed Bishop of Pasto

Other priests of this diocese who became bishops
Fernando Torres Durán, appointed Auxiliary Bishop of Panamá in 1996
Héctor Epalza Quintero (prest here, 1965-1989), appointed Bishop of Buenaventura in 2004

Suffragan dioceses
 Buenaventura 
 Buga
 Cartago
 Palmira

See also
Roman Catholicism in Colombia

References

External links
 Catholic Hierarchy
 Diocese website 
 GCatholic.org

Roman Catholic dioceses in Colombia
Roman Catholic Ecclesiastical Province of Cali
Christian organizations established in 1910
Roman Catholic dioceses and prelatures established in the 20th century
1910 establishments in Colombia